Tristan Do (born 31 January 1993) is a Thai professional footballer who plays as a right back for Thai League 1 club Bangkok United and the Thai national team.

Club career
In 2014, Do joined BEC Tero Sasana in the Thai League 1, but left for Muangthong United in 2016. In 2019, he signed for Bangkok United.

International career
Do made his senior debut in the friendly match against Afghanistan in September 2015. He also played for the Thailand under-23 team at the 2015 Southeast Asian Games.

Personal life
His native language is French but he learned Thai after he moved back to Pak Kret, Nonthaburi. Do's paternal grandfather is Vietnamese who immigrated to Thailand at a young age, thus making him theoretically eligible to play for Vietnam. He has cousins who live in Singapore.

Career statistics

Club

International

Honours

Club
BEC Tero Sasana
 Thai League Cup (1): 2014

Muangthong United
 Thai League 1 (1): 2016
 Thai League Cup (2): 2016, 2017
 Thailand Champions Cup (1): 2017
 Mekong Club Championship (1): 2017

International
Thailand U-23
 SEA Games  Gold Medal (1): 2015

Thailand
 AFF Championship (2): 2016, 2020

Individual
 AFF Championship Best XI: 2016
 ASEAN Football Federation Best XI: 2017'''

References

External links
Tristan Do profile at Muangthong United website

1993 births
Living people
Footballers from Paris
Tristan Do
Tristan Do
Tristan Do
French footballers
Tristan Do
Tristan Do
French people of Thai descent
French people of Vietnamese descent
Sportspeople of Vietnamese descent
Association football fullbacks
Ligue 1 players
FC Lorient players
Gazélec Ajaccio players
Ligue 2 players
SAS Épinal players
Tristan Do
Tristan Do
Tristan Do
Tristan Do
Expatriate footballers in Thailand
Championnat National players
Tristan Do
Southeast Asian Games medalists in football
2019 AFC Asian Cup players
Competitors at the 2015 Southeast Asian Games